The following is a list of major films which used Autodesk 3ds Max software, or one of its previous versions, in some of the visual effects shots:

References

3ds Max
Films made with Autodesk 3ds Max
Films made with Autodesk 3ds Max
3D films